A list of the films produced in Mexico in 1958 (see 1958 in film):

1958

See also
1958 in Mexico

External links

1958
Films
Lists of 1958 films by country or language